The Tampa Women's Open was a golf tournament on the LPGA Tour from 1947 to 1960. It was played at the Palma Ceia Golf & Country Club in Tampa, Florida. The 1950 event was the first official event on the LPGA Tour. The events played before the LPGA was founded in 1950 are recognized as official wins.

Winners
 1960 Mickey Wright
 1959 Ruth Jessen
 1958 Betsy Rawls
 1957 Betsy Rawls
 1956 Betsy Rawls
 1955 Babe Zaharias
 1954 Betsy Rawls
 1953 Louise Suggs
 1952 Louise Suggs
 1951 Babe Zaharias
 1950 Polly Riley (amateur)
 1949 Patty Berg
 1948 Betty Jameson
 1947 Babe Zaharias (amateur)

References

Former LPGA Tour events
Golf in Florida
Sports competitions in Tampa, Florida
1947 establishments in Florida
1960 disestablishments in Florida
Recurring sporting events established in 1950
Recurring sporting events disestablished in 1960
Women's sports in Florida